is a 2021 Japanese superhero crossover film between the Kamen Rider and Super Sentai franchises and was released on July 22, 2021, in a double billing with a special film for the then-upcoming Kamen Rider Revice.

The casts of Kamen Rider Saber and Kikai Sentai Zenkaiger are featured, though some cast members of other series such as Mashin Sentai Kiramager, Kamen Rider Zero-One, Kamen Rider Zi-O, Uchu Sentai Kyuranger, Kamen Rider OOO, Samurai Sentai Shinkenger, Kamen Rider Den-O, Tokusou Sentai Dekaranger, Himitsu Sentai Gorenger and Kamen Rider also participate. Additionally, the titular protagonists of Kamen Rider Revice, Kamen Rider Revi and Kamen Rider Vice, make their first appearance.

The film pays tribute to the 50th anniversary of the Kamen Rider franchise and the 45th anniversary of the Super Sentai franchise while also paying homage to the original creator of both, Shotaro Ishinomori.

Plot
At the Sword of Logos' Agastya Base space station, the guardian Asmodeus rebels and takes control of all the books containing the Kamen Riders and Super Sentai's stories, merging them into one story. Meanwhile, Touma Kamiyama, Mei Sudo, and Yuri are transported to the world of Kikai Sentai Zenkaiger while Zenkaiger members Kaito Goshikida, Gaon, Magine, and Vroon are transported to the world of Kamen Rider Saber. Kamiyama's group encounter Juran while he is searching for his teammates, help him repel one of Tozitend's attacks, and meet a young boy called Shotaro. Regrouping at the Zenkaigers' headquarters, they make contact with Goshikida's group through Secchan and learn of what happened from Sophia.

Suddenly, Asmodeus uses his powers to send Goshikida and Rintaro Shindo to a world based on Journey to the West and Kamiyama, Juran, Sudo, and Shotaro to one based on Nansō Satomi Hakkenden. With help from several Riders and Sentai warriors they meet along the way, both groups get to the end of their respective stories and reunite to confront Asmodeus. However, he convinces Shotaro that both the Riders and Sentai groups should not exist as they always suffer over the course of their stories. Shotaro destroys his drawings, causing the Riders and Sentai to disappear. While vanishing, Kamiyama discovers he and his friends were part of a story as well instead of the real world before waking up in a world where they live peaceful lives and the battles they faced never happened. Realizing that facing hardships is what makes heroes human and that Shotaro is actually a young, time-displaced Shotaro Ishinomori, the creator of the Riders and Sentai's stories, Kamiyama finds and convinces him to create heroes again. Together, they create a new story called Super Hero Senki. 

Concurrently, Asmodeus joins forces with the Riders and Sentai groups' enemies to take over the story worlds, only to be opposed by the Sword of Logos, Zenkaigers, Twokaizer, and their Rider and Sentai predecessors, who destroy the villains while Asmodeus is defeated by Kamen Riders Revi and Vice. Asmodeus absorbs his fallen allies' machinery to enlarge himself and transform into a dragon, but the Sentai warriors summon their mecha to join the Riders in destroying him. As the heroes return to their respective worlds, Kamen Rider 1 recognizes Shotaro as his creator. Though the latter realizes he is at a point in time where he is already dead, he rejoices knowing that his creations will continue inspiring others long after his death and promises to fulfill his dream of making hero stories before returning to his time. The Agastya Bases books are restored while Kamiyama, Sudo, and the Zenkaigers stop by the Colorful cafe to celebrate their victory and discuss Revi and Vice's story.

Cast

Kamen Rider series cast
: 
: 
: 
: 
: 
: 
: 
: 
: 
: 
: 
: 
: 
: 
: 
: 
: 
: 
: 
: 
: 
: 
: 
: 
: 
:

Super Sentai series cast
: 
: 
: 
: 
: 
: 
: 
: 
: 
: 
: M·A·O
: 
: 
:

Super Hero Senki cast
: 
: 
: 
:

Promotion

Production
Shinichiro Shirakura, one of the film's producers, has stated that Super Hero Senki will be the last crossover film between the Kamen Rider and Super Sentai franchises.

Theme song
"SPARK"
Lyrics: Atsushi Yanaka
Composition: Yuichi Oki
Artist & Arrangement: Tokyo Ska Paradise Orchestra
Vocals: Hajime Omori

Reception

Saber + Zenkaiger: Super Hero Senki earned $4,128,826 at the box office.

References

External links
Official website 

2020s Japanese superhero films
Crossover tokusatsu films
Kamen Rider films
Super Sentai films
2020s superhero films